Viti or Víti may refer to:

Places
 Viti, Estonia, a village in Estonia
 Viti, Kosovo, a town and municipality in Kosovo
 Víti (meaning "hell" in Icelandic), the name of several locations in Iceland:
 Víti (Askja), a warm crater lake near Askja caldera in central Iceland
 Víti (Krafla), a crater lake in Krafla caldera in northern Iceland
 Viti is the Fijian-language name of Fiji, an island nation in the South Pacific Ocean:
Bei Kai Viti, a political party in Fiji in the years 1999-2005
Premier of the Kingdom of Viti, head of the first unified Fijian state 1871-1874
Tui Viti, a title which denotes Fijian royalty and translates as King of Fiji
Viti Levu, the largest island in Fiji
Viti Levu giant pigeon, Natunaornis gigoura, a prehistoric flightless pigeon from Fiji
Viti Levu Group, a group of islands in Fiji
Viti Levu rail, Vitirallus watlingi, a prehistoric bird from Fiji
Viti Levu scrubfowl, Megapodius amissus, a prehistoric bird from Fiji
Viti Levu snipe, Coenocorypha miratropica, a prehistoric bird from Fiji

People
 Viti (footballer), Spanish footballer 
 Fabrizio Viti (born 1967), Italian fashion designer
 Serena Viti, astrophysicist 
 Timoteo Viti, an Italian painter (1469—1523)

Other
 Viti language, spoken in Nigeria
 Viti-dandu, another name for gilli-danda, an amateur sport similar to cricket.
 "viti" is a word in Albanian which means "year".

Animal common name disambiguation pages